Winstein is a surname. Notable people with the surname include: 

Bruce Winstein (1943–2011), American physicist and cosmologist
Keith Winstein, American computer scientist and journalist
Saul Winstein (1912–1969), Canadian chemist
Grunwald–Winstein equation, physical organic chemistry equation, developed with Ernest Grunwald